The  is an electric multiple unit (EMU) commuter train type operated by the Kyoto Municipal Subway in Kyoto from March 2022.

Overview 
The 20 series was introduced in 2022 with nine 6-car sets. These sets are replacing the oldest of the existing 10 series in service since 1981. Power consumption on these trains is projected to be about 30 percent less than the 10 series counterparts.

Formation 
Trainsets are formed as follows:

Interior 
The interior consists of longitudinal seating throughout. Cars 1 and 6 feature leaning pads at the centre of the end section which will increase standing room; these spaces are designated as "Omoiyari Areas".

History 
The design of what would become the 20 series was announced by the Kyoto Municipal Transportation Bureau on 29 March 2019 after a public vote.

The first set was delivered in 2021, and test runs commenced in October of that year. A total of 9 sets, 54 cars, are to be built by Kinki Sharyo.

The 20 series made its first trips in revenue service on the Karasuma Line on 26 March 2022; in addition, the fleet began service on the Kintetsu Kyoto and Nara lines from 12 and 17 April of that year, respectively. A second trainset entered service on 21 June 2022. Deliveries are expected to last until 2025.

To commemorate the type receiving the 2022 Good Design Award, a third set, scheduled to enter service on 18 November 2022, was built with commemorative "Kitayama Log" plating. Such plating is due to be applied to the pre-existing fleet as well as subsequent sets.

Notes

References

External links 
 

Kyoto Municipal Subway
Electric multiple units of Japan
Train-related introductions in 2022
Kinki Sharyo multiple units
1500 V DC multiple units of Japan